Bayangol (Mongolian: rich river) is one of nine Düüregs (districts) of the Mongolian capital Ulaanbaatar. It is divided into  23 Khoroos (subdistricts). It was previously called October District before 1992.

Bayangol has a population of 192,600.

It is the headquarters of Mongolian National Bandy Federation.

References

External links
 official website 

Districts of Ulaanbaatar